This is a list of flag bearers who have represented Senegal at the Olympics.

Flag bearers carry the national flag of their country at the opening ceremony of the Olympic Games.

See also
Senegal at the Olympics

References

Senegal at the Olympics
Senegal
Olympic flagbearers
Olympics